This is a list of Ice Road Truckers Season 8 episodes.

This season all drivers from season 7 return to Winnipeg, and the same companies, Polar and VP Express, are shown. This is also the first season in which the program is a US / Canadian co-production, with Prospero Media and Shaw Media (owners of the Canadian History franchise) producing the show with Original Productions and History (as seen in the end credits of each episode). Season 8 premiered on July 7, 2014.

Episodes

Returning drivers
Darrell Ward, Art Burke, and Lisa Kelly drive for Polar. Todd Dewey switches from VP Express to Polar. Alex Debogorski drives for longtime rival Hugh Rowland’s and Vlad Pleskot’s VP Express. After a tense verbal exchange with Polar owner Mark Kohaykewych, Darrell quits Polar in episode 5, frustrated with repeated truck breakdowns and how few loads he has been given, and goes into business for himself. Joey Barnes appears in episode 10 to escort Burke on a delivery run through the Manitoba wilderness, after Burke avoided being fired after jack-knifing his truck the previous trip. Also in episode 5, Burke was fined $490 and "shut down" (suspended from driving) for three days, due to multiple log-book infringements and over-working, from being stuck in the snowstorm on the previous round trip. In episode 12, Kelly, Burke, Dewey, Darrell and Reno all make it to Fort Severn, while Kelly decides to support Darrell and help him go further into Peawanuck. Kelly was not censured by Mark for her actions, as it was "a morally and ethically right thing to do," and she was offered a job by Darrell for the next season; she was undecided on switching sides.

This was Hugh Rowland's final season, as he was involved in a 2014 pickup accident.

New driver
 Reno Ward: Darrell Ward’s son, he was hired to help his father in episode 9.

Route and destinations
Manitoba/Ontario ice roads: Two new destinations in northwestern Ontario: Fort Severn and Peawanuck.

Final load counts
Polar: 171
VP: 170
Total: 341

References 

 

2014 American television seasons
Ice Road Truckers seasons